The 1987 PBA season was the 13th season of the Philippine Basketball Association (PBA).

Board of governors

Executive committee
 Mariano A. Yenko, Jr. (Commissioner) 
 Rodriguo Salud (Deputy Commissioner)
 Reynaldo Marquez  (Chairman, representing Formula Shell)
 Jose Ibazeta (Vice Chairman, representing Magnolia Ice Cream)
 Wilfred Steven Uytengsu (Treasurer, representing Hills Bros. Coffee Kings)

Teams

Season highlights
Manila Beer disbanded its franchise at the start of the season, reducing the league's membership to only 6 teams, their players were absorbed by the rest of the PBA ballclubs. 
The PBA, in partnership with a newly formed league called International Basketball Association (IBA) of the United States for players 6–4 and below, staged a successful mini-tournament for one week, featuring the top PBA All-Filipino teams and the US (IBA) Selection.
Tanduay Rhum Makers, which won the Open Conference crown, were eliminated and finish last in the succeeding two conferences, announces that the team is headed for disbandment the following year, leaving only two founding members of the PBA (San Miguel and Great Taste).
The San Miguel Beermen, behind best import Bobby Parks, won the Reinforced Conference crown and their third PBA title since returning in the third conference of last year. SMB coach Norman Black won his first championship as a mentor and he became the third American to steer his team to a PBA title after Jerry Webber and Ron Jacobs.

Opening ceremonies
The muses for the participating teams are as follows:

Champions
 Open Conference: Tanduay Rhum Makers
 All-Filipino Conference: Great Taste Coffee Makers
 Reinforced Conference: San Miguel Beermen
 Team with best win–loss percentage: Magnolia/San Miguel Beermen (43–23, .652)
 Best Team of the Year: Great Taste Coffee Makers (3rd & Final)

Open Conference

Elimination round

Quarterfinal round

Semifinal round

Third place playoffs 

|}

Finals results

|}
Best Import of the Conference: David Thirdkill (Tanduay)

All-Filipino Conference

Elimination round

Semifinal round

Third place playoffs 

|}

Finals

|}

Reinforced Conference

Elimination round

Semifinal round

Third place playoffs 

|}

Finals

|}

 Best Import of the Conference: Bobby Parks (San Miguel)

Awards
 Most Valuable Player: Abet Guidaben (San Miguel)
 Rookie of the Year:  Allan Caidic (Great Taste)
 Most Improved Player: Elpidio Villamin (Hills Bros.)
 Best Import-Open Conference: David Thirdkill (Tanduay)
 Best Import-Reinforced Conference: Bobby Parks (San Miguel)
 Mythical Five:
Philip Cezar (Great Taste)
Hector Calma (San Miguel)
Abet Guidaben (San Miguel)
Elpidio Villamin (Hills Bros.)
Allan Caidic (Great Taste)
 Mythical Second Team:
Ricardo Brown (Great Taste)
Arnie Tuadles (Great Taste)
Ramon Fernandez (Tanduay)
Bernardo Carpio (Great Taste)
Ricky Relosa (Hills Bros.)
 All-Defensive Team:
Chito Loyzaga (Ginebra)
Philip Cezar (Great Taste)
Elpidio Villamin (Hills Bros.)
Ricky Relosa (Hills Bros.)
Biboy Ravanes (Shell)

Cumulative standings

References

 
PBA